Naddha is a village located at the border of three districts; Gujranwala and Sialkot, in Pakistan. It is located in Thana Wahndo of Gujranwala district near Sakhana Bajwa village. Naddha only has one middle school for girls and one primary school for boys. The village is located on an old route from Narowal to Gujranwala and further to Hafizabad and Sargodha. The road still exists today, but for single-lane traffic only.

 There was a sizable population of Sikhs and some Hindus before they migrated to India. Muslims from Eastern Punjab side migrated to Pakistan and settled here.

Villages in Gujranwala District